Spitfire Ace is a combat flight simulator video game created and published by MicroProse shortly after it was founded. It was one of the first video games designed and programmed by Sid Meier, originally developed for Atari 8-bit family (1982) and ported to the Commodore 64 and IBM PC compatibles (as a self-booting disk) im 1984. The game followed on the heel's of Meier's Hellcat Ace, also from 1982 and for the Atari 8-bit computers.

Gameplay
The game puts the player in the pilot's seat during World War II.  The player defends London during The Blitz while flying the Supermarine Spitfire. The game offers 15 different scenarios that include France, Malta and D-Day.

Development
Sid Meier developed Spitfire Ace as a modified version of Hellcat Ace, another game he programmed, released earlier that same year. In his 2020 memoir, Meier described Spitfire Ace as "the kind of game we'd probably call an expansion pack today. It used the same code base as Hellcat Ace, but moved the battle scenarios from the Pacific to the European theater."

Reception
Softline in 1984 called Spitfire Ace and Hellcat Aces graphics "extremely simple". Computer Gaming World in 1993 stated that the game "has been severely wrinkled by age".

References

External links
Spitfire Ace at Atari Mania

1982 video games
Atari 8-bit family games
Commodore 64 games
Sid Meier games
U.S. Gold games
Video games set in France
World War II flight simulation video games
Video games developed in the United States